Ivo Welch, a German-born   economist and finance academic. He is the J. Fred Weston Professor of Finance at UCLA Anderson School of Management. 
He completed his BA in computer science in 1985 at Columbia University, and both his MBA and PhD in finance at the University of Chicago.

His research has focused on financial economics and informational cascades.  
Publications include articles in academic journals and the popular press, in addition to a self published Corporate Finance textbook.  
He was previously on the faculties of the Yale School of Management (Professor of Economics and Finance) and Brown University's economics department (Professor of Financial Economics). 
He is an National Bureau of Economic Research (NBER) Research Associate. He has been editor of the Critical Finance Review since inception.

Professor Welch is a two-time recipient of the Michael Brennan Award. He ranked about 50th by downloads on SSRN. in 2014, but has since slipped to 100th (by 2021), both by downloads and by cites.  In 2006, he ranked 54th on the Web of Science list of "Most-Cited Scientists in Economics & Business"; in 2007 (the last year of the rankings), he ranked 57th.   On Google Scholar, his work had gathered about 40,000 cites in 2019, increasing by about 2,500 cites per year thereafter.  In the German Handelsblatt VWL Rankings of economists with German background 2019, his life work was ranked second (behind Roman Inderst) for finance professors and sixth among all economics professor.   He is a Humboldt Foundation 2015 fellow.

References

External links 
 

German economists
21st-century American economists
Living people
University of Chicago Booth School of Business alumni
Columbia University alumni
1963 births
Financial economists
Corporate finance theorists
Brown University faculty
Yale School of Management faculty
UCLA Anderson School of Management faculty